Fernando Espínola (born 26 June 2000) is a Paraguayan footballer who plays as an attacking midfielder for Paraguayan Primera División side Club Sol de América.

Career

Club career
Espínola is a product of Club Sol de América. He got his professional debut for the club in the Paraguayan Primera División on 29 April 2019, when he was in the starting lineup against Sportivo Luqueño. He made a total of three appearances in that season.

References

External links
 

Living people
2000 births
Association football midfielders
Paraguayan footballers
Paraguayan Primera División players
Club Sol de América footballers